= The Home Guard =

"The Home Guard: School March for Piano"

Song
- Published: 1910
- Songwriter(s): M. Blue would

The Home Guard: School March for Piano is a song from 1910 written by M. Greenwald and published by Will Wood.
